Thomas Galloway Dunlop du Roy de Blicquy Galbraith, 2nd Baron Strathclyde,  (born 22 February 1960), known informally as Tom Strathclyde, is a British Conservative politician. Lord Strathclyde served in the political role of Leader of the House of Lords from the 2010 general election until January 2013 and as Chancellor of the Duchy of Lancaster, having been Leader of the Opposition in the House of Lords (1998–2010).

Biography
Thomas Galbraith was born in Glasgow, the son of Conservative politician Hon Sir Tam Galbraith and his Belgian wife Simone du Roy de Blicquy. His father was MP for Glasgow Hillhead from 1948 until his death in 1982. Galbraith succeeded to the barony in 1985 at the age of 25, following the death of his grandfather Thomas Galbraith, 1st Baron Strathclyde. He contested the Merseyside East constituency in the 1984 European election.

Education

Galbraith was educated at Sussex House School, in London, and Wellington College near Sandhurst, Berkshire.  He attended the University of East Anglia, where he graduated in 1982 with a Bachelor of Arts degree in Modern Languages and European Studies. He also studied at Aix-Marseille University.

House of Lords
Strathclyde entered the House of Lords in 1986, becoming a Junior Whip in 1988, then Minister for Tourism in 1989. Between 1990 and 1992, he was Minister for Agriculture and Fisheries in the Scottish Office. He then served in the Department of the Environment and the Department of Trade and Industry, before being appointed the Conservative Party Chief Whip in the House of Lords in 1994, succeeding Lord Ullswater. The next year, he was sworn of the Privy Council.

In 1998 Strathclyde, along with the Conservative front bench in the Lords, threatened to tender his resignation if the party refused to accept a proposed compromise plan for reform of the Lords that had been negotiated with the Labour Party by Lord Cranborne, the Conservatives' leader in the Lords, unbeknown to the Leader of the Opposition (in the Commons) William Hague, and to his annoyance. Hague however accepted the proposals, dismissing Cranborne for the conduct in negotiations, and Strathclyde was appointed to succeed him. Under his leadership, the House of Lords Act 1999 passed: under this, Strathclyde was elected by other peers as one of the 92 hereditary peers to remain in the House of Lords.

He won Channel 4 Peer of the Year 2000, and Spectator Peer of the Year 2004.

When the Conservatives formed a coalition government under David Cameron in May 2010, Strathclyde became Leader of the House of Lords and Chancellor of the Duchy of Lancaster, with a seat in the Cabinet.

On 7 January 2013, Strathclyde announced that he would be stepping down as Leader of the House of Lords, and resigning from the Cabinet with immediate effect, to pursue a second business career. He was succeeded by Lord Hill of Oareford. He was subsequently appointed a Companion of Honour for his services to the Lords.

Marriage and children 
Strathclyde married Jane Skinner, elder daughter of John Skinner, in 1992. They have three daughters:

 Hon. Elizabeth Ida Skinner Galbraith (born 1 December 1993)
 Hon. Annabel Jane Simone Skinner Galbraith (born 15 May 1996)
 Hon. Rose Marie Louise Skinner Galbraith (born 27 January 1999)

The family lives in Westminster and at the Galbraith family estate in Mauchline, Ayrshire.

As Strathclyde has no sons, the heir presumptive to the peerage is his younger brother, the Hon. Charles William du Roy de Blicquy Galbraith (b. 1962).

Outside interests
Lord Strathclyde is a governor of Wellington College, Berkshire. He received an Honorary Doctorate of Civil Law from the University of East Anglia in July 2018.

He is a director of Auchendrane Estates Ltd, a landowning company in Scotland. His wealth is estimated at £10m.

He was a non-executive director on the board of Trafigura's hedge-fund arm, Galena Asset Management, from 2004 until 2009. Trafigura defended court actions during the 2006 Ivory Coast toxic waste dump scandal and The Guardian suggested his appointment may be an attempt to de-toxify the Dutch company globally.

Arms

Notes

References

External links
 Profile at the Conservative Party
 
 
 Article archive at The Guardian

|-

|-

|-

|-

|-

|-

|-

|-

1960 births
Alumni of the University of East Anglia
Barons Strathclyde
Conservative Party (UK) Baronesses- and Lords-in-Waiting
Conservative Party (UK) hereditary peers
Chancellors of the Duchy of Lancaster
Honourable Corps of Gentlemen at Arms
Living people
Members of the Order of the Companions of Honour
Members of the Privy Council of the United Kingdom
People educated at Wellington College, Berkshire
Politicians from Glasgow
Scottish people of Belgian descent
Leaders of the House of Lords
People educated at Sussex House School
Hereditary peers elected under the House of Lords Act 1999